The discography of American rock band A Day to Remember consists of seven studio albums, three video albums, three extended plays and twenty-one singles. The band signed to Indianola in February 2005 and released their debut album And Their Name Was Treason a few months later. Their second album, For Those Who Have Heart, was released in January 2007 and peaked at number 17 on the Heatseekers Album chart in the US; a re-release charted at number 43 on the Independent Albums chart in the US. Released in February 2009, Homesick charted at number 21 on the Billboard 200 chart and at number 1 on the Independent Albums chart. From the album, only the "Have Faith in Me" single charted; at number 40 on the Alternative Songs chart. Second single "The Downfall of Us All" and album track "If It Means a Lot to You" were both certified Gold by the RIAA for 500,000 downloads each. Fourth album What Separates Me from You (2010) debuted at number 11 on the Billboard 200 and its lead single "All I Want" peaked at number 12 on the Alternative Songs chart. Fifth album Common Courtesy (2013) was first released only digitally due a legal label dispute; a physical release followed later. The band released their sixth album, Bad Vibrations, in 2016 which charted at number 2 on the Billboard 200. The band released their seventh album You're Welcome in 2021.

Studio albums

EPs

Video albums

Singles

As featured artist

Promotional singles

Other songs certificated
 "I'm Made of Wax, Larry, What Are You Made Of?": RIAA: Gold

Music videos

Original multi-artist compilation appearances

See also
List of songs recorded by A Day to Remember

References
Footnotes

Citations

Discography
Discographies of American artists
Post-hardcore group discographies
Pop punk group discographies
Heavy metal group discographies